Ray T. Chesbro (1925 – March 3, 2017) was an American politician who served in the New York State Assembly from the 117th district from 1981 to 1990.

He died on March 3, 2017, in Phoenix, New York at age 91.

References

1925 births
2017 deaths
Republican Party members of the New York State Assembly